Anders Eriksson Hästehufvud (1577–1657) was a Swedish officer, who served as Governor of Duchy of Estonia between 1617–1619 and Governor-General of Swedish Livonia in 1628.

External links
 Hästehufvud, Anders Eriksson – Svenskt biografiskt handlexikon at Project Runeberg 

1577 births
1657 deaths
Swedish nobility